BMOC can refer to:

Backup mission operations center, in spacecraft operations
"Big Man on Campus", an American colloquialism for a popular high school or college boy involved in some high-profile activity, such as varsity sports or school government
British Mathematical Olympiad Committee

Art, entertainment, and media
"B.M.O.C." (The Cleveland Show), an episode of the U.S. TV series The Cleveland Show 
Big Man on Campus, a television series